Fortescue may refer to:

People
 Fortescue (surname), a British surname Includes list of name-holders
 Fortescue Ash (1882–1956), Anglican bishop in Australia
 Fortescue Graham (1794–1880), British Royal Marines general

Places
 Fortescue, Missouri, United States, a village
 Fortescue, New Jersey, United States
 County of Fortescue, Queensland, Australia
 Fortescue Bay, Tasmania, Australia
 Fortescue River, Western Australia

Titles
 Earl Fortescue, a title in the Peerage of Great Britain
 Fortescue baronets
 Baron Fortescue of Credan, an extinct title in the Peerage of Ireland

Other uses
 Fortescue Metals Group, an Australian iron ore company
 Fortescue National Football League, an Australian rules football league
 Fortescue grunter (Leiopotherapon aheneus), a freshwater fish
 Fortescue transformation for symmetrical components
 Fortescue, protagonist of The House of Fortescue, a 1916 silent film
Centropogon australis or Fortescue, a venomous fish common to Eastern Australia
 Fortescue (novel), an 1846 novel by Irish writer James Sheridan Knowles